Naples is a town in Cumberland County, Maine, United States. It is part of the Portland–South Portland–Biddeford, Maine metropolitan statistical area. The population was 3,925 at the 2020 census, and it is home to part of Sebago Lake State Park. Naples is a resort area.

History

The area was settled in 1790. Farming was limited by the soil, which consisted of gravelly loam, its surface strewn with glacial erratic boulders. The uplands, however, provided good grazing for livestock, and hay became the principal crop.

Named for Naples, Italy, the town was incorporated on March 4, 1834, from parts of Otisfield, Harrison, Raymond and Bridgton. Between 1845 and 1856, it annexed more land from Sebago, Otisfield and Bridgton. The Songo Lock, completed two years before town incorporation, linked Long Lake and Brandy Pond with Sebago Lake, allowing passage of boats from Harrison to Portland through the Cumberland and Oxford Canal in Standish. A canning factory and cooperage were established at Naples village. The community also produced carriages, men's and boy's clothing, boots and shoes.

The scenery of the lakes, however, would make tourism the dominant industry. Visitors in the 19th century included Henry Wadsworth Longfellow and Nathaniel Hawthorne. To accommodate his passengers, Charles L. Goodridge of the Sebago Lake, Songo River & Bay of Naples Steamship Company built a hostelry on a knoll at the southern end of Long Lake. On July 26, 1899, the Bay of Naples Inn opened with 80 bedrooms. It was designed by John Calvin Stevens, who reduced by two-fifths a plan originally created for the ill-fated Metallak Hotel in Colebrook, New Hampshire. While under construction, the Metallak was destroyed in April 1893 during a violent windstorm, and its investors abandoned the project. The Bay of Naples Inn, which faced Mount Washington and the east side of the White Mountains, was a popular resort during the early 20th century. Automobile tourists began arriving after designation of the Theodore Roosevelt International Highway in 1919 (identified as United States Route 302 since 1935).  The Bay of Naples Inn remained open through the 1951 season, but in 1964 was deemed unprofitable and razed.

Since 1985 The Naples Casino building has hosted the world famous Rick's Cafe

Geography

Naples is drained by the Songo River.

Water bodies that are adjacent to or within of Naples include:
 Sebago Lake
 Chute River
 Long Lake
 Brandy Pond
 Trickey Pond

Demographics

2010 census

As of the census of 2010, there were 3,872 people, 1,579 households, and 1,094 families living in the town. The racial makeup of the town was 97.4% White, 0.3% African American, 0.2% Native American, 0.5% Asian, 0.2% from other races, and 1.4% from two or more races. Hispanic or Latino of any race were 0.7% of the population.

There were 1,579 households, of which 30.4% had children under the age of 18 living with them, 53.8% were married couples living together, 10.6% had a female householder with no husband present, 4.9% had a male householder with no wife present, and 30.7% were non-families. 23.1% of all households were made up of individuals, and 6.6% had someone living alone who was 65 years of age or older. The average household size was 2.45 and the average family size was 2.83.

The median age in the town was 42.9 years. 22.2% of residents were under the age of 18; 6.8% were between the ages of 18 and 24; 24.4% were from 25 to 44; 33% were from 45 to 64; and 13.6% were 65 years of age or older. The gender makeup of the town was 51.2% male and 48.8% female.

2000 census

As of the census of 2000, there were 3,274 people, 1,297 households, and 931 families living in the town. The racial makeup of the town was 98.20% White, 0.15% African American, 0.31% Native American, 0.31% Asian, 0.21% from other races, and 0.82% from two or more races. Hispanic or Latino of any race were 0.21% of the population.

There were 1,297 households, out of which 32.1% had children under the age of 18 living with them, 58.6% were married couples living together, 8.3% had a female householder with no husband present, and 28.2% were non-families. 21.7% of all households were made up of individuals, and 8.9% had someone living alone who was 65 years of age or older.  The average household size was 2.52 and the average family size was 2.90.

In the town, the population was spread out, with 24.6% under the age of 18, 5.6% from 18 to 24, 29.8% from 25 to 44, 25.3% from 45 to 64, and 14.7% who were 65 years of age or older.  The median age was 40 years. For every 100 females, there were 102.3 males.  For every 100 females age 18 and over, there were 97.2 males.

The median income for a household in the town was $38,141, and the median income for a family was $40,825. Males had a median income of $31,458 versus $24,596 for females. The per capita income for the town was $18,176.  About 6.9% of families and 7.6% of the population were below the poverty line, including 10.4% of those under age 18 and 2.3% of those age 65 or over.

Arts and culture

Site of interest

 Naples Historical Society Museum

Notable people

 Augustus Bove, state legislator with the Republican Party
 Matthew Brill, state Republican Pary as of 2006
 Richard Cebra, state legislator with the Maine Republican Party (2004–2012) (2016–current) and state Republican Party chairman (2012–2013)
 Major Knight, state legislator with the Greenback Party (1880)
 Daniel Merriam, watercolorist
 Christine Powers, state legislator with the Maine Democratic Party (2012–2016)
 Richard Thompson, state legislator with the Maine Democratic Party (1994–2000)

References

External links
 Town of Naples official website
 Naples Public Library
 Muddy River Sno Seekers Snowmobile Club
 Sebago Lake State Park
 Maine Genealogy: Naples, Cumberland County, Maine

 
Towns in Cumberland County, Maine
Portland metropolitan area, Maine
Towns in Maine